William Mills was an English professional footballer who played as an inside right in the Football League for Leicester Fosse.

Personal life 
Mills served on the Western Front with the British Army during the First World War and lost a foot.

Career statistics

References

Year of death missing
1891 births
British Army personnel of World War I
English amputees
English footballers
Leicester City F.C. players
Barnet F.C. players
Footballers from Hackney, London
English Football League players
Association football inside forwards
English disabled sportspeople
Association footballers with limb difference